Never Preach Past Noon: A Leigh Koslow Mystery is a crime novel by the American writer Edie Claire set in contemporary Pittsburgh, Pennsylvania. The novel is the third in a series of five Leigh Koslow mysteries.

The novel follows the story of advertising copywriter Leigh Koslow, whose  Aunt Bess breaks her ankle falls down the stairs in the middle of the night.  When Leigh discovers that  Bess fell down the stairs of happily wedded pastor, Leigh investigates the relationship.

While reviewing the novel, Midwest Book Review writes that "Edie Claire is a bright new mystery writer. The fast-paced story line retains a serious tone with humorous interludes to ease the tension and turn the sleuthing relatives into real people. A winning amateur sleuth tale that showcases a new talent."

Sources
Contemporary Authors Online. The Gale Group, 2006.

External links
  Author's homepage

2000 American novels
American crime novels
Novels set in Pittsburgh
Signet Books books